Gennady (or Gennadii or Gennadiy) Semenovich Makanin (1938–2017) was a Russian mathematician, awarded the 2010 I. M. Vinogradov Prize for a series of papers on the problem of algorithmically recognizing the solvability of arbitrary equations in free groups and semigroups.

Education and career
At Moscow State University he received his undergraduate degree and in 1967 his Russian Candidate of Sciences degree (PhD). His dissertation К проблеме тождества в конечно-определённых группах и полугруппах (On the identity problem in finitely-presented groups and semigroups) was supervised by Andrey Markov Jr. and Sergei Adian.

Makanin spent his career (since 1966) working at the Steklov Institute of Mathematics (since 2013 as a freelance employee). From the Steklov Institute of Mathematics he received in 1977 his Russian Doctor of Sciences degree (similar to habilitation) with dissertation Проблема разрешимости уравнений в свободной полугруппе (The problem of solvability of equations in a free semigroup). On the basis of his 1977 dissertation he was an invited speaker at the 1978 International Congress of Mathematicians in Helsinki.

He gained international recognition for his research on combinatorial group theory and algorithmic problems in the theory of semigroups. Zlil Sela, Eliyahu Rips, and others have made important applications of Makanin-Razborov diagrams to geometric group theory.

In 1982 Makanin published a complete solution (an algorithm with proof of validity) to the problem of recognizing the solvability of equations in a free group. An English translation was published in 1983. In 1984 (followed by English translation in 1985) he published a proof, using techniques similar to those in his 1982 paper, of the decidability, for any free group, of two different formal theories generated by that free group.

Remarks on Makanin's research
Martin Davis and Julia Robinson worked unsuccessfully on the problem which was eventually solved in 1977 by Makanin:

Yuri Matiyasevich published a generalization of what he called the "celebrated theorem of G. S. Makanin about decidability of word equations".

Selected publications

References

External links
 Маканин Геннадий Семёнович (Russian full list of publications)
 Makanin, Gennadiy Semenovich (English full list of publications)
 http://www.mathnet.ru/person/13873

1938 births
2017 deaths
Mathematical logicians
Soviet logicians
Russian logicians
Russian philosophers
Soviet mathematicians
20th-century Russian mathematicians
21st-century Russian mathematicians
Moscow State University alumni